Limona was an unincorporated community in Hillsborough County, Florida. It existed by that name from about 1876 to about the 1963, when it became part of the unincorporated town of Brandon, Florida.

External links
 http://freepages.genealogy.rootsweb.com/~vanrcwisner/hilllima.html

Geography of Hillsborough County, Florida
1876 establishments in Florida